Rini Budiarti (born 1983) is an Indonesian athletics competitor. She represented Indonesia at the 2014 Asian Games held in Incheon, South Korea. She competed in the women's 3000 metres steeplechase event and she finished in 5th place.

In 2015, she competed in the senior women's race at the 2015 IAAF World Cross Country Championships held in Guiyang, China. She finished in 76th place. In the same year, she also won the gold medal in the women's 3000 metres steeplechase and the silver medal in the women's 5000 metres event at the 2015 Southeast Asian Games held in Singapore.

References

External links 
 

Living people
1983 births
Place of birth missing (living people)
Indonesian female long-distance runners
Indonesian female cross country runners
Athletes (track and field) at the 2014 Asian Games
Asian Games competitors for Indonesia
Competitors at the 2011 Southeast Asian Games
Competitors at the 2013 Southeast Asian Games
Competitors at the 2015 Southeast Asian Games
Southeast Asian Games medalists in athletics
Southeast Asian Games gold medalists for Indonesia
Southeast Asian Games silver medalists for Indonesia
Southeast Asian Games bronze medalists for Indonesia
20th-century Indonesian women
21st-century Indonesian women